José Alcino Rosa (born 8 June 1974), commonly known as Zé Alcino, is a Brazilian former footballer.

Career statistics

Club

Notes

References

1974 births
Living people
Brazilian footballers
Brazilian expatriate footballers
Association football forwards
Sport Club Internacional players
Grêmio Foot-Ball Porto Alegrense players
AS Nancy Lorraine players
Beijing Renhe F.C. players
Esporte Clube São José players
Grêmio Esportivo Brasil players
Clube Esportivo Bento Gonçalves players
Esporte Clube Novo Hamburgo players
Esporte Clube Avenida players
Campeonato Brasileiro Série A players
Ligue 1 players
Ligue 2 players
Brazilian expatriate sportspeople in France
Expatriate footballers in France
Brazilian expatriate sportspeople in China
Expatriate footballers in China